Columbus Before the Queen is a 97.9 x 129.4 cm oil on canvas painting by German-American painter Emanuel Leutze. The painting is signed, and dated 1843. It is in the collection of the Brooklyn Museum, in New York, US.

Description
Leutze executed six treatments related to Christopher Columbus; this was the third. The Genoese navigator is at the center of the composition, set at the Spanish court, where he addresses the Catholic Monarchs, Isabella of Castile and Ferdinand II of Aragon, both enthroned, while trying to convince them to support his plan to reach India by travelling west. The queen looks away, with a hand on her head, seemingly distraught, while the king addresses Columbus. The set seems Moorish, possibly relating to the recent conquest of the Kingdom of Granada in 1492. Several male and female courtiers are present, while a monk unveils a nautical chart in support of Columbus project. A cardinal in a red hat is seated at the left corner.

The painting is typical of the historical genre cultivated by Leutze.

References

1843 paintings
Paintings by Emanuel Leutze
History paintings
Cultural depictions of Christopher Columbus